The 2021–22 Texas State Bobcats men's basketball team represented Texas State University in the 2021–22 NCAA Division I men's basketball season. The Bobcats, led by second-year head coach Terrence Johnson, played their home games at Strahan Arena in San Marcos, Texas as members of the Sun Belt Conference. They finished the season 18–7, 12–3 in Sun Belt play to win the regular season championship. They lost in the quarterfinals of the Sun Belt tournament to Louisiana. As a regular season champion who did not win their conference tournament, they received an automatic bid to the National Invitation Tournament where they lost in the first round to North Texas.

Previous season
In a season limited due to the ongoing COVID-19 pandemic, the Bobcats finished the 2020–21 season 18–7, 12–3 in Sun Belt play to finish in first place in the West Division. They were upset by Appalachian State in the quarterfinals of the Sun Belt tournament. 
After leading the Bobcats to their first Sun Belt regular season championship, Terrence Johnson, who had been named interim head coach after head coach Danny Kaspar resigned amid allegations of racially insensitive language used at players, was named the team's head coach.

Roster

Schedule and results

|-
!colspan=12 style=| Non-conference regular season

|-
!colspan=12 style=| Sun Belt regular season

|-
!colspan=9 style=| Sun Belt tournament

|-
!colspan=9 style=| NIT tournament

Source

References

Texas State Bobcats men's basketball seasons
Texas State Bobcats
Texas State Bobcats men's basketball
Texas State Bobcats men's basketball
Texas State